Arbroath in Forfarshire was a burgh constituency that elected one commissioner to the Parliament of Scotland and to the Convention of Estates.

After the Acts of Union 1707, Arbroath, Aberdeen, Brechin, Inverbervie and Montrose formed the Aberdeen district of burghs, returning one member between them to the House of Commons of Great Britain.

List of burgh commissioners

 1661–63: John Ochterlony, provost 
 1667 convention, 1669–74: Henry Fithie, merchant, provost 
 1678 convention, 1681–82, 1685–86: John Kidd, bailie 
 1689 convention, 1689–1702: Patrick Stiven 
 1702–07: John Hutchison, provost

See also
 List of constituencies in the Parliament of Scotland at the time of the Union

References

Constituencies of the Parliament of Scotland (to 1707)
Politics of the county of Forfar
History of Angus, Scotland
Constituencies disestablished in 1707
1707 disestablishments in Scotland
Arbroath